Merseyside is a metropolitan county in North West England. It was created by the Local Government Act 1972, and consists of the metropolitan boroughs of Knowsley, St Helens, Sefton, Wirral, and the city of Liverpool.  Buildings are listed on the recommendation of English Heritage to the Secretary of State for Culture, Media and Sport, who makes the decision whether or not to list the structure.  Grade I listed buildings are defined as being of "exceptional interest, sometimes considered to be internationally important"; only 2.5 per cent of listed buildings are included in this grade.  This is a complete list of Grade I listed churches in the metropolitan county of Merseyside as recorded in the National Heritage List for England.

Christian churches have existed in Merseyside since the Anglo-Saxon era, but no significant Saxon features remain in its listed churches. The churches in this list fall principally into two groups: those originating mainly from the medieval period, which are in Gothic style, and those built during the 19th and 20th centuries, which are mainly in Gothic Revival style, with only a few churches created between those periods.  Gothic churches from the medieval era include St Andrew, Bebington and All Saints, Childwall – both of which incorporate Norman material – St Mary, Prescot, and St Helen, Sefton.  During the 19th century, some of the country's finest architects designed churches in Gothic Revival style. Examples include St Agnes and St Pancras, Toxteth Park, by J. Loughborough Pearson, St John the Baptist, Tuebrook, by G. F. Bodley, and All Hallows, Allerton, by G. E. Grayson.  Liverpool Cathedral, designed by Giles Gilbert Scott and built during the 20th century, is also in Gothic Revival style.  Chapels built between the two periods were the Ancient Chapel of Toxteth, and The Oratory by John Foster.  The Oratory and the steeple of St Mary, Prescot, are the only buildings in the list in Neoclassical style.  Two of the churches in the list were pioneers in the use of cast iron in their structure and decoration: St Michael, Aigburth, and St George, Everton.  All the churches referred to above are Anglican.  The churches in the list from other denominations are the Roman Catholic church of St Clare, Sefton Park, and Ullet Road Unitarian Church.  In 2017 the Roman Catholic Church of St. Monica, Bootle, designed in Modernist style, was promoted to Grade I.

The region covered by this list was sparsely populated until the later part of the 19th century.  Its largest conurbation is the city of Liverpool, a port and commercial centre.  There is industry in and around Liverpool and in the town of St Helens, but the economy of much of the region is agricultural.  The bedrock consists mainly of sandstone, which is the stone chiefly used for building the churches of the region.  The superficial deposits are of boulder clay, which provides material for making bricks.

Churches

Notes

References

Bibliography

 

 

 
Merseyside
 
 
Lists of listed buildings in Merseyside